Radka Valíková (born 13 March 1991) is a Czech female canoeist who won eleven medals at individual senior level of the Wildwater Canoeing World Championships and European Wildwater Championships.

References

External links
 

1991 births
Living people
Czech female canoeists
Place of birth missing (living people)